Esfarayen County is in North Khorasan province, Iran. The capital of the county is the city of Esfarayen. At the 2006 census, the county's population was 119,152 in 30,307 households. The following census in 2011 counted 127,012 people in 35,903 households. At the 2016 census, the county's population was 120,513 in 36,519 households.

 The majority of the population of Esfrain are Kurds, and the Kurdish dialect of Kermanji is very popular in the northern areas of Khorasan, such as Esfrain.
The surrounding mountains and deserts have become totally Kurdish and Turkmen in their ethnicity and language. It was only Esfarayen that resisted the flood of violence that swept away the ancient and sedentary Persian speaking farmers and town folks of northern Khurasan, starting with the Mongol invasion, coming of the destructive tribes, and finally the massive murder and depopulation of northern Khurasan in the 18th and 19th centuries in the hands of Turkmen raiders and slave catchers. Khurasani Persians were found in great numbers at the slave markets of Khiva and Kashgar in China in the late 19th century, being sold by the Turkmens. Esfarayen preserves what the entire northwestern Khurasan (include the whole of southern half of Turkmenistan must have looked like before the avalanche of the Turkic nomadic invasion began in the 11th century.

Administrative divisions

The population history of Esfarayen County's administrative divisions over three consecutive censuses is shown in the following table. The latest census shows two districts, seven rural districts, and two cities.

References

 

Counties of North Khorasan Province